Jos Croin (March 15, 1894 – November 24, 1949) was a Dutch painter. His work was part of the painting event in the art competition at the 1924 Summer Olympics. Croin's work was included in the 1939 exhibition and sale Onze Kunst van Heden (Our Art of Today) at the Rijksmuseum in Amsterdam.

References

Further reading
 "Jos Croin, een psychologische critiek", J. Helder, in Elsevier’s Geïllustreerd Maandschrift, 1921, pp. 355–358
 "Jos Croin", J. de Kat, in Morks' magazijn, June 1925, pp. 351–354
 "Bij het werk van Jos Croin" in Algemeen geïllustreerd weekblad, 31 October 1931
 "Jos Croin in de kunstzaal van Hasselt te Rotterdam", Koomen, in Elsevier’s Geïllustreerd Maandschrift, 1932, pp. 149–151
 "Jos Croin bij G.J. Nieuwenhuizen Segaar te 's-Gravenhage", Cornelis Veth, in Maandblad voor Beeldende Kunsten, 1946, p. 40
 Jos Croin, Cornelis Veth, Het Hollandsche Uitgevershuis, Amsterdam 1947
 "Jos Croin’s werk van de laatste jaren bij Huinck en Scherjon", D.V. Nijland, in Maandblad voor beeldende kunsten, 1950, No. 26, pp. 19–20
 Lexicon Nederlandse beeldende kunstenaars 1750-1950, Pieter A. Scheen; Kunsthandel, Pieter A. Scheen N.V., ’s-Gravenhage 1969, p. 232
 Kleine meesters van het expressionisme, Jan Dirk van Scheyen, PZC 6 December 2001

1894 births
1949 deaths
19th-century Dutch painters
20th-century Dutch painters
Dutch male painters
Olympic competitors in art competitions
Painters from Middelburg
19th-century Dutch male artists
20th-century Dutch male artists